The Strategic Services Unit was an intelligence agency of the United States government that existed in the immediate post–World War II period.  It was created from the Secret Intelligence and Counter-Espionage branches of the wartime Office of Strategic Services.

Assistant Secretary of War John J. McCloy was instrumental in preserving the two branches of the OSS as a going-concern with a view to forming a permanent peace-time intelligence agency.   The unit was established on October 1, 1945, through Executive Order 9621, which simultaneously abolished the OSS. The SSU was headed by General John Magruder.

In January 1946, a new National Intelligence Authority was established along with a small Central Intelligence Group.  On April 2, 1946, the Strategic Services Unit was transferred to the new group as the Office of Special Operations and a transfer of personnel began immediately.

In 1947, the Central Intelligence Agency was established under the 1947 National Security Act, incorporating the Central Intelligence Group. In August 1952, the Office of Special Operations was combined with the Office of Policy Coordination to form the Directorate of Plans.

References

Government agencies established in 1946
United States intelligence agencies
United States Department of War
Central Intelligence Agency
Human intelligence (information gathering)
Counterintelligence agencies
Cold War history of the United States